= Inclov =

Defunct Indian dating site

- Industry: Matrimonials
- Founded: 2016 in Mumbai, India
- Founder: Kalyani Khona
- Defunct: 2019
- Headquarters: Gurugram, India
- Key people: Kalyani Khona, Shankar Srinivasan
- Products: Matrimonial Application
- Owner: Kalyani Khona
- Parent: Inclov Technologies Private Limited
- Website: inclov.com (defunct)

Inclov was an Indian dating site for disabled people that operated from 2016 to 2019.

== History ==
Inclov was established in 2016 by Kalyani Khona, and Shankar Srinivasan later joined as a co-founder. It was based in Gurugram, India. The application was available in Hindi, English, and Punjabi languages. Khona initially started the business offline as a marriage bureau in Mumbai named Wanted Umbrella in 2014, and after receiving favourable feedback from the disabled community and a round of crowd-funding, went online with the Inclov name, and Srinivasan as co-founder, in 2016.

In 2017, Inclov raised pre-Series A funding.

The company ceased operations in 2019.

== Idea ==
The idea behind Inclov was to create an inclusive place for people with disabilities to find their marriage partner, and counter social inhibitions regarding disabilities in India.Social Spaces was an initiative spread across India by Inclov to organize accessible meet-ups of disabled people.
